KCM may refer to:

KCM (singer), a South Korean singer
KCM, Katie Couric Media, a multimedia news and production company
KCM, Knight Commander of the Royal Order of Monisaraphon
KCM, Konkola Copper Mines, a Zambian company
KCM, a single task Prolog co-processor with private memory of the 1990s
Kathmandu College of Management
, a Christian televangelist ministry
Kosovo Campaign Medal, a U.S. military medal